Guilherme Augusto Alves Dellatorre (born 1 May 1992), simply known as Dellatorre, is a Brazilian footballer who plays as a striker for Montedio Yamagata.

Club career
Born in São José do Rio Preto, Dellatorre represented Rio Preto Esporte Clube and Desportivo Brasil as a youth. Playing on loan at the latter, he contributed to the side in the 2011 São Paulo Junior Football Cup by scoring seven goals and becoming the top scorer of the tournament.

After senior professional stints with Rio Preto in the 2010 Paulista A2 and Desportivo Brasil in the same year, Dellatorre signed with Sport Club Internacional on loan in 2011. But after having to score any goal in the season's Série A, he was assigned to the under-20 team.

On 6 July 2012, Dellatorre joined Portuguese club FC Porto on a season long loan deal, and was assigned to the B-team. On 4 January 2013, he was called to the main team by manager Vítor Pereira for a league match against CD Nacional. He was an unused substitute in the match.

On 3 July 2013, Dellatorre joined Atlético Paranaense. He scored five goals in 31 matches, as his side ended the league on the third position. On 31 January 2014, he was loaned to English second tier club Queens Park Rangers. He made his debut for the junior team on 4 March, starting in a 1–0 defeat against Ipswich Town. However, after having failed to make a single appearance with the first team, the club announced at the end of the season that he would return to his parent club.

In the 2015 season, Dellatorre contributed with no goals in nine matches in the national league and two goals in seven matches in the state league, Paranaense. On 12 January 2016, he signed with Thai club Suphanburi F.C. on a year long loan deal.

On 19 December 2017, Dellatorre switched to the Cypriot First Division and signed with APOEL FC.

Career statistics

Honours
Internacional
 Recopa Sudamericana: 2011

CSA
Campeonato Alagoano: 2021

References

1992 births
Living people
Footballers from São Paulo (state)
Brazilian footballers
Association football forwards
Campeonato Brasileiro Série A players
Campeonato Brasileiro Série B players
Sport Club Internacional players
FC Porto players
Club Athletico Paranaense players
Queens Park Rangers F.C. players
Primeira Liga players
J2 League players
Brazilian expatriate footballers
Brazilian expatriate sportspeople in Portugal
Expatriate footballers in Portugal
Brazilian expatriate sportspeople in England
Expatriate footballers in England
Expatriate footballers in Thailand
Expatriate footballers in Japan
Brazilian expatriate sportspeople in Cyprus
Brazilian expatriate sportspeople in Japan
APOEL FC players
Centro Sportivo Alagoano players
Atlético Clube Goianiense players
Montedio Yamagata players